Albert Watkins Key, Jr., publishing under the name Watt Key and Albert Key, is an American fiction author who is known for writing young-adult survival fiction. A resident of Alabama, his debut novel Alabama Moon was published by Farrar, Straus and Giroux in 2006 and was the 2007 winner of the E.B. White Read-Aloud Award for older readers. It received a 2006 Parents' Choice Award. Alabama Moon has been translated and published in eight languages. In 2015 Alabama Moon was listed by TIME Magazine as one of the top 100 young-adult books of all time.

Alabama Moon was made into a 2009 feature film starring John Goodman.

Personal life

Watt Key is a graduate of Bayside Academy in Daphne, Alabama and received his Bachelor of Arts degree from Birmingham–Southern College in Birmingham, Alabama. He earned his Masters of Business Administration from Spring Hill College in Mobile, AL. While working as a computer programmer, he began submitting novels to publishers in New York City. When he was 34, he sold his debut novel, Alabama Moon, to publisher Farrar, Straus and Giroux.

Watt currently lives with his wife and three children in Mobile, Alabama.

Awards and honors 
Alabama Moon (2006)
American Library Association Best Books for Young Adults
 ABC E.B. White Read Aloud Award, 2007
ALLA Young Adult Book Award
Auckland Council librarian's choice
 SIBA Young Adult Book Award, 2007
Parents' Choice Award Winner
 California Young Reader Medal
 Illinois Rebecca Caudill Young Readers Choice Award Master List
Indiana Young Hoosier Award Master List 
James Medison University Book Award List: Best Books For Young Adults
Maine Student Book Award Master List 
Missouri Truman Readers Award Master List
Massachusetts Children’s Book Award Master List for 2011
 Volunteer State Book Award Nominees
Wildcat Book Award Nominees 2008-2009
Dirt Road Home (2010)
ALLA Young Adult Book Award
The Cybils Awards Master List
Fourmile (2012)
Bank Street Best Children's Book of the Year 2013
2014-2015 Indian Paintbrush Nominee Titles
Kirkus Best Teen Books of the Year
Indiana Young Hoosier Award Master List 
Maine Student Book Award Master List 
2014-2015 MASL Readers Awards Preliminary Nominees
The Mobile Bay Art & Music Awards (MODDYs) Master list
South Carolina Children's Book Award Master List 2014
 Vermont Dorothy Canfield Fisher Award Master List

Published works

Novels and collections
Alabama Moon, Farrar, Straus and Giroux, 2006
Dirt Road Home, Farrar, Straus and Giroux, 2010
Fourmile, Farrar, Straus and Giroux, 2012
Among the Swamp People, The University of Alabama Press, 2015
Terror at Bottle Creek, Farrar, Straus and Giroux, 2016
Hideout, Farrar, Straus and Giroux, 2017
Deep Water, Farrar, Straus and Giroux, 2018
Bay Boy, The University of Alabama  Press, 2019
Beast, Farrar, Straus and Giroux, 2020
The Forgotten Coast, (as Albert Key) Penfish Press, 2021
The Black Hat and Other Tales of Horror, (as Albert Key) Penfish Press, 2021

Memoir, essays
 Swamp Writer series, Mobile Bay Magazine, August 2012 - June 2014
 Bay Boy series, Mobile Bay Magazine, July 2014

Screenplays
Alabama Moon, Faulkner-McLean Productions, 2009
L.A. Dirt, Tundra Films, 2014

References

External links 
 
 Watt Key at Macmillan Publishers
 
 Alabama Moon Movie Official site

Book reviews
 , The New York Times
 , Booklist Online
 , Decatur Daily
Bibliography
 

1970 births
American children's writers
Living people
People from Baldwin County, Alabama
Novelists from Alabama
20th-century American novelists
21st-century American novelists
American male novelists
20th-century American male writers
21st-century American male writers